From Acid to Zen is the Norwegian rock band BigBang's ninth album, and the first released exclusively for the American market. It consist mainly of previously released material, except for two new songs. It was released on September 9, 2008.

Reception
David Fricke of Rolling Stone selected the album as his "Fricke's Pick", writing, "From Acid to Zen is a big step in a bigger gamble", and, "It’s a shotgun buffet, like those early U.S. LPs by the Beatles and the Rolling Stones that combined album tracks and singles from unrelated sessions, and it succeeds the same way: like an instant greatest-hits record".

Track list
"Early December" (from Too Much Yang)
"Wild Bird" (from Electric Psalmbook)
"The One" (new for this release)
"Saturn Freeway" (from Poetic Terrorism)
"Hurricane Boy" (from Too Much Yang)
"My First Time" (from Too Much Yang)
"Savior Soul" (new for this release)
"From A Distance" (from Poetic Terrorism)
"Wherever You Are" (from Poetic Terrorism)
"From Acid to Zen" (from Poetic Terrorism)
"When the World Comes to an End" (from Frontside Rock'n'Roll)

References

2008 albums
Bigbang (Norwegian band) albums
Oglio Records albums